M400 is a gearbox from Volvo used in Volvo 164 and in a modified version, a limited number of the early 1970 1800E. A stronger version of the M40 gearbox designed to withstand the higher power of the B30 engine, it can be identified by the drain plug being on the opposite side to the M40. While never factory equipped with the "long stick" shifter handle, the shifter interchanges, opening up possibilities for swaps. Owners have found that while the bearings' lifespan might be similar to that of the M40, the torque capacity is in the order of double. Ratios are effectively the same (though derived from a different tooth count) as the M40s and followed that transmission's change to a lower (numerically higher) first gear beginning with the 1973 model year.+

M410
When equipped with the electrically operated overdrive the gearbox was known as the M410.

External links
ZF Aftermarket

Volvo Cars
Automobile transmissions